José Marcelo Ferreira (born 25 July 1973), commonly known as Zé Maria, is a retired Brazilian football player turned coach. He is currently working for Parma as a technical collaborator within the club's youth system.

Known for his pin-point crosses, he could play either as a right back or right midfielder, and played the vast majority of his professional career, other than in his country, in Italy's Serie A, where he represented three teams, mainly Perugia.

Club career
Born in Oeiras, Piauí, Zé Maria started his professional career with Portuguesa in 1991, being loaned two times during his contract with the club. In 1995, he was selected in the Bola de Prata Brazilian League team of the year. This led to him being signed by Flamengo in 1996.

In the summer, Zé Maria moved to Italy after signing with Serie A club Parma, playing regularly for two seasons. Subsequently, he remained in Italy, joining Perugia.

With the Umbrians Zé Maria had a shaky start, being loaned three times back to Brazil, during which time he won the Copa Libertadores with Palmeiras, and the Copa do Brasil with Cruzeiro. Eventually, he established himself in the Perugia starting line-up, helping his team finish 10th in his third full season whilst contributing with six goals. Via the UEFA Intertoto Cup he and the side reached the third round of the subsequent UEFA Cup, but also suffered domestic relegation.

After two seasons with giants Inter – playing rather regularly in his first but making only eight appearances (mostly as a substitute) in his second (with Inter winning the Scudetto courtesy of the Calciopoli affair), 49 official ones overall – Zé Maria was released and joined La Liga club Levante UD on a free transfer: starting the season as first-choice right-back the 33-year-old lost the position and finished with 14 league appearances, with the Valencians barely avoiding relegation.

Released again, Zé Maria entailed unsuccessful negotiations with several teams, reportedly Sheffield United and Queens Park Rangers in England, thus returning to Brazil and Portuguesa in January 2008. In August, after having rescinded his contract, he surprisingly accepted an offer from A.S.D. Città di Castello, in the Italian Eccellenza (amateur championships).

Zé Maria settled in Italy after his retirement from football, at the age of 36. He subsequently founded a football school in Perugia.

International career
Zé Maria gained 25 caps for Brazil over a period of five years. He was not selected for any FIFA World Cup but did participate in two FIFA Confederations Cups, including the original in Saudi Arabia which the national team won, and one Copa América (also ended in win, in Bolivia).

In 1996 Zé Maria helped the Olympic team win bronze at the 1996 Summer Olympics in Atlanta, appearing in all six matches.

Managerial career

Beginnings
On 15 March 2010 Zé Maria took his first head coaching job, accepting Serie D club S.S.D. Group Città di Castello's offer. He was then appointed manager of fourth division team F.C. Catanzaro for the 2010–11 campaign, being however removed from his post after a few months.

Tirana
On 16 June 2017, Tirana announced the signing of Zé Maria on a one-year contract. He lost his first match in charge later on 29 June, a 2–0 away loss to Maccabi Tel Aviv at Netanya Stadium in the 2017–18 UEFA Europa League first qualifying round. Tirana was knocked out from the competition after losing the second leg.

Zé Maria won his first silverware with the club later on 6 September, the 2017 Albanian Supercup, with Tirana defeating Kukësi thanks to an Erion Hoxhallari late winner. By doing so, Tirana become the first ever Albanian First Division club to win the supercup. Tirana begun the championship by recording a 1–0 home win versus Iliria Fushë-Krujë. They successfully eliminated Besa Kavajë 4–1 on aggregate in the 2017–18 Albanian Cup first round. Tirana ended September by winning all the matches, and did so also in November, taking the lead of Group B. During his time, Zé Maria also guided Tirana to the biggest win of the season, 6–0 versus Shkumbini Peqin.

Tirana finished the year in the first place, conceding only one defeat, the one versus Bylis Ballsh. Zé Maria called the defeat "a shame". The team also eliminated Vllaznia Shkodër in the second round of Albanian Cup. In January 2018, Tirana brought Kenneth Muguna, Mohammed Musa and Samson Iliasu at the request of Zé Maria. In February 2018, Tirana was eliminated by Kukësi in the quarter-final of Albanian Cup.

Tirana continued their winning streak, eventually finished top of Group B to qualify to promotion play-off. Later on 14 April, the team mathematically achieved promotion to top flight next season by winning 3–2 at home against Pogradeci. On 16 May, Tirana was named Albanian First Division champions after beating 2–0 the Group A winners Kastrioti Krujë. Later on 2 June, Zé Maria agreed a contract extension with the club until June 2020.

Later years
On 5 October 2022, Parma announced to have hired Zé Maria as a technical collaborator for the youth team.

Managerial record

Honours

Player
Flamengo
 Campeonato Carioca: 1996
Palmeiras
Copa Libertadores: 1999
Cruzeiro
Copa do Brasil: 2000
Perugia
UEFA Intertoto Cup: 2003
Inter Milan
Serie A: 2005–06
Coppa Italia: 2004–05, 2005–06
Brazil
Copa América: 1997
FIFA Confederations Cup: 1997
1996 Summer Olympics: Bronze Medalist

Managerial
Tirana
Albanian Supercup: 2017
Albanian First Division: 2017–18

References

External links
 
  
 
 
 
 

1973 births
Living people
Association football defenders
Brazilian footballers
Brazil international footballers
1996 CONCACAF Gold Cup players
1997 Copa América players
1997 FIFA Confederations Cup players
1998 CONCACAF Gold Cup players
2001 FIFA Confederations Cup players
Copa América-winning players
FIFA Confederations Cup-winning players
Olympic footballers of Brazil
Olympic bronze medalists for Brazil
Footballers at the 1996 Summer Olympics
Olympic medalists in football
Medalists at the 1996 Summer Olympics
Associação Portuguesa de Desportos players
Club Sportivo Sergipe players
Associação Atlética Ponte Preta players
CR Flamengo footballers
Parma Calcio 1913 players
A.C. Perugia Calcio players
CR Vasco da Gama players
Sociedade Esportiva Palmeiras players
Cruzeiro Esporte Clube players
Inter Milan players
Levante UD footballers
Campeonato Brasileiro Série A players
Campeonato Brasileiro Série B players
Serie A players
La Liga players
Brazilian expatriate footballers
Expatriate footballers in Italy
Brazilian expatriate sportspeople in Italy
Expatriate footballers in Spain
Brazilian expatriate sportspeople in Spain
Brazilian football managers
U.S. Catanzaro 1929 managers
CSM Ceahlăul Piatra Neamț managers
Gor Mahia F.C. managers
KF Tirana managers
Associação Portuguesa de Desportos managers
Brazilian expatriate football managers
Expatriate football managers in Italy
Expatriate football managers in Romania
Brazilian expatriate sportspeople in Romania
Expatriate football managers in Kenya
Expatriate football managers in Albania
Brazilian expatriate sportspeople in Albania
Sportspeople from Piauí